David "Leche" Ruiz (born 1976) is a director and actor, best known for writing and directing 2021 Mexican crime-drama soap series Who Killed Sara?

Based in Mexico City, Ruiz began his career directing music videos. He directed six episodes of Who Killed Sara? including the pilot and the finale.

Filmography

Television (as director) 

 Morir en Martes 2 (2011 TV Series)
 La Piloto (2017 TV Series) (3 episodes)
 Descontrol (2018 TV Series) (3 episodes)
 La Negociadora (2020 TV Series) (7 episodes)
 Who Killed Sara? (2021 TV Series) (6 episodes)

Film (as director) 

 The Last Death (2011 film)

References 

1976 births
Living people
Mexican television directors
Mexican television writers
Mexican film directors